Hewitt may refer to:

Places 

United Kingdom
 Hewitt (hill), Hills in England, Wales and Ireland over two thousand feet with a relative height of at least 30 metres

United States
 Hewitt, Minnesota, a city
 Hewitt, Texas, a city
 Hewitt, Marathon County, Wisconsin, a town
 Hewitt, Wood County, Wisconsin, a village
 Hewitt Quadrangle, on the campus of Yale University

Other uses 
 Hewitt (name)
 , US Navy destroyer
 SS Hewitt, ship that went missing in 1921
 Hewitt Associates, global human resources outsourcing and consulting firm
 G. W. & W. D. Hewitt, architectural firm

See also 
 Hewett (disambiguation)